Ion Nunweiller (9 January 1936 – 3 February 2015) was a Romanian football defender and manager.

Club career
Ion Nunweiller was born in Piatra Neamț on 9 January 1936. He had an Austrian father named Johann Nunweiller, who settled in Piatra Neamț after World War II where he met his wife, Rozina, later they moved from Piatra Neamț to Bucharest. He had six brothers, the oldest one of them, Constantin was a water polo player and the other five: Dumitru, Lică, Victor, Radu and Eduard were footballers, each of them having at least one spell at Dinamo București, they are the reason why the club's nickname is "The Red Dogs". Ion made his Divizia A debut, playing for Dinamo București on 12 August 1956 in a 2–0 victory against Dinamo Bacău. Throughout his two spells at Dinamo București he won five Divizia A titles and three Cupa României, also appearing in the first European match of a Romanian team in the 1956–57 European Cup in the 3–1 victory against Galatasaray, helping the team go to the next phase of the competition where they were eliminated by CDNA Sofia, playing for Dinamo in a total of 19 European Cup matches in which he scored two goals in the 1963–64 edition, one in a 2–0 victory against East Germany champion, Motor Jena which helped the club advance to the next phase where they were eliminated by Real Madrid, scoring in a 5–3 loss and made one appearance in an Inter-Cities Fairs Cup match. Nunweiller spent two seasons in Turkey at Fenerbahçe from 1968 until 1970, making him one of the first Romanians to play professional football in Turkey. During his period spent in Turkey, Nunweiller won a Turkish Super League title, a TSYD Cup in which he scored the only goal from the final against Beşiktaş, played four games in the 1968–69 European Cup where he helped Fenerbahçe eliminate the champion of England, Manchester City, was elected the best foreign player of the Turkish league in the 1969–70 season and in his second season spent at the club he was coached by Traian Ionescu and was teammate with Ilie Datcu, all of them previously working together at Dinamo.

International career
Ion Nunweiller played 26 games at international level for Romania, making his debut on 26 October 1958 under coach Augustin Botescu in a friendly which ended with a 2–1 loss against Hungary. He played four games at the 1960 European Nations' Cup qualifiers as Romania reached the quarter-finals where they were defeated by Czechoslovakia, who advanced to the final tournament. Nunweiller played two games at the 1964 European Nations' Cup qualifiers, one game at the 1966 World Cup qualifiers and four at the Euro 1968 qualifiers. He also played for Romania's Olympic team, appearing in four games at the 1964 Summer Olympics, helping Romania finish 5th in the competition.

Managerial career
After ending his playing career in 1972, Ion Nunweiller became the head coach of Dinamo București, managing to win the title in his first season. He won two more titles with Dinamo, qualified Flacăra Moreni in the UEFA Cup, had an experience in Turkey at Bursaspor and obtained the first ever promotion to Divizia A of his hometown team Ceahlăul Piatra Neamț. Nunweiller has a total of 374 matches as a manager in the Romanian top-division, Divizia A consisting of 163 victories, 76 draws and 135 losses.

On 25 March 2008, Nunweiller was decorated by the president of Romania, Traian Băsescu for all of his achievements as a football coach, and for forming young generations of future champions with Ordinul "Meritul Sportiv" — (The Order "The Sportive Merit") class III.

Honours

Player
Dinamo București
Divizia A: 1961–62, 1962–63, 1963–64, 1964–65, 1970–71
Cupa României: 1958–59, 1963–64, 1967–68
Fenerbahçe
Turkish Super League: 1969–70
TSYD Cup: 1969–70

Manager
Dinamo București
Divizia A: 1972–73, 1974–75, 1976–77
Ceahlăul Piatra Neamț
Divizia B: 1992–93

Notes

References

External links

1936 births
2015 deaths
Sportspeople from Piatra Neamț
Romanian footballers
Romanian people of Austrian descent
Association football defenders
Romania international footballers
Olympic footballers of Romania
Footballers at the 1964 Summer Olympics
Liga I players
Liga II players
Victoria București players
FC Dinamo București players
Süper Lig players
Fenerbahçe S.K. footballers
Romanian expatriate footballers
Romanian expatriate sportspeople in Turkey
Expatriate footballers in Turkey
Romanian football managers
FC Dinamo București managers
ACF Gloria Bistrița managers
Victoria București managers
CSM Flacăra Moreni managers
FC Argeș Pitești managers
Bursaspor managers
CSM Ceahlăul Piatra Neamț managers
CS Minaur Baia Mare (football) managers
CS Corvinul Hunedoara managers
Romanian expatriate football managers
Expatriate football managers in Turkey